The 2011 Brazil Masters was a professional non-ranking snooker tournament that took place between 15 and 18 September 2011 at Costão do Santinho Resort in Florianópolis, Brazil.

Shaun Murphy won in the final 5–0 against Graeme Dott.

Prize fund
The breakdown of prize money for this year is shown below:
Winner: $40,000
Runner-up: $20,000
Semi-final: $11,000
Quarter-final: $7,000
Last 16: $4,000
Appearance fee for 14 professionals: $4,000
Highest break: $2,000
Total: $200,000

Main draw

Final

Century breaks
 
 139, 111 Shaun Murphy
 114 Igor Figueiredo
 113 Stephen Hendry

References

Snooker non-ranking competitions
2011 in snooker
Masters
September 2011 sports events in South America